Bavon is an unincorporated community in Mathews County, Virginia, United States.

References

Unincorporated communities in Mathews County, Virginia
Unincorporated communities in Virginia